Nicholas Strange (born 15 August 1966) is a British rower. He competed in the men's lightweight double sculls event at the 1996 Summer Olympics.

References

External links
 

1966 births
Living people
British male rowers
Olympic rowers of Great Britain
Rowers at the 1996 Summer Olympics
Sportspeople from Canterbury